There are various bodies with this name, including
Institute of Science and Technology, Austria
Institute of Science and Technology, Bangladesh
Institute of Science and Technology, TU
Institute of Science and Technology, UK
Institute of Science and Technology, West Bengal

Educational institution disambiguation pages